Cheias de Charme (English: Sparkling Girls) is a Brazilian musical telenovela produced and broadcast by TV Globo. It premiered on 16 April 2012 and ran for 143 episodes, with the finale airing on 28 September 2012, replacing Aquele Beijo and preceding Guerra dos Sexos.

It is created and written by Filipe Miguez, Izabel de Oliveira in collaboration with Daisy Chaves, Isabel Muniz, João Brandão, Lais Mendes Pimentel, Paula Amaral and
Sérgio Marques. The telenovela is directed by Allan Fiterman, Maria de Médicis, Natália Grimberg and Denise Saraceni.

Features performances by Taís Araújo, Cláudia Abreu,
Leandra Leal, Isabelle Drummond, Ricardo Tozzi,
Malu Galli, Marcos Palmeira and
Jonatas Faro.

Plot
The plot tells the story of three maids - Maria da Penha, Maria Aparecida (Cida) and Maria do Rosario who, by luck or talent, will change their lot. Penha is a 34-year-old woman, hardworking, who raised her siblings Alana and Elano, after their parents abandoned them. Penha is wife of Sandro, a trickster who does not want to work and is addicted to football. Penha and Sandro have a son, little Patrick. Penha works as a maid in the house of the singer Chayene, an eletroforró tecnobrega diva and bitter woman who has a bad phase, this she attributes to a nonexistent overweight. Chayene is an evil woman who mistreats all her employees. One day Chayene physically assaults Penha, after she accidentally burned her dress. Penha goes to the police station to report the employer.

Rosario is a cook, who dreams of being a singer and is passionate about singer Fabian. She finally gets to go to one of his shows, but gets into tremendous trouble. The singer's bodyguards catch her and take her to the police station. Rosario knows Inácio, a simple man, who looks exactly like Fabian, and therefore hates him. Inácio suffers from being confused with the singer by his crazy fans. Rosario falls for him. But Inácio just wants to have a family, and doesn't endorse Rosario's dream of being a singer.

Cida is a 19-year-old girl who lives with her godmother, Valda, in her employer's house, Sônia, a rich woman rich married to Ernani. She has two daughters: Ariela and Isadora. Cida's mother, Dolores, was Sônia's maid, before she died. Cida and her godmother work as domestic servants and are very mistreated by employers. Cida catches her boyfriend, Rodinei, with another woman in a nightclub and gets into trouble. She is also taken to the police station.

Penha, Cida and Rosario end up in jail for contempt. They meet in jail and sympathize with each other. The three maids make a pact: "Employee by day, lady by night." Rosario will work in Chayene's house instead of Penha. Penha in turn, will work for Lygia, a good hearted lawyer. Cida falls for Conrado Werneck, a rich man without character, who doesn't know she is an employee. Isadora arrives from travelling, and Conrado discovers the entire truth. Isadora is bad and envious and plans to separate Cida from Conrado and stay with him, which proves successful as Conrado and Isadora later get married. Despite his love for Cida, Conrado marries Isadora only to please his father, Otto. Cida suffers greatly at the hands of her employers, especially with Sônia and Isadora, who humiliate her constantly. Mother and daughter are the villains of her story. Ariela is the eldest daughter of Sônia and being overweight tries several crazy diets. Ariela is engaged to Humberto, and is somewhat snobbish and thus a comical villain.

One day, Rosario called Penha and Cida to Chayene's house, while her employer is outside. The three decide to have fun and with the help of Kleiton, create a song "Vida de Empreguete." There, the video clip is shot, with the girls using Chayene's clothes. The clip is a success and they decided to form a band, "Empreguetes." They write new songs like "Marias Brasileiras", "Forro das Curicas" among others. The Empreguetes start being more and more successful, which excites the entrepreneur Tom Bastos and Fabian, who wants, at all costs, to separate Rosario and Inácio. The success of Empreguetes also arouses the envy of Chayene, who with the help of her maid, Socorro, is obsessed with the singers and will make all the she can to harm the trio.

As the trio becomes more and more famous, Chayene becomes less famous and always lands into trouble but with the help of Laércio, her assistant, she always finds a way out. Her lack of success is due to the harm that she tries to inflict on them.

After Penha, Rosario and Cida become popular, surprising events begin to occur.

Valda reveals to Ernani Sarmento that Cida is his daughter after he becomes broke when his company collapses due to Conrado's malice. When Cida finds out about this, she is in pain at first but, later rejoices over it. She moves in with the broke Sarmento's while her apartment is being renovated. During one night, Cida encounters Conrado on her way to the kitchen and Conrad kisses her. Unfortunately, Isadora catches them and is dismayed. Conrado leaves the house immediately but before he does, he acknowledges that he is still in love with Cida. Isadora becomes furious and gets revenge by tearing all of Cida's clothes and steals her credit card and goes shopping with her mother. When Cida finds out that her card was stolen, she wants to put them behind bars but Ernani doesn't let her do so. She instead turns Isadora and Sônia into maids.

She brings in changes and this includes letting her godmother, Valda, be treated as a guest. Her move into the Sarmento house brings much dismay to Olano, who is in love with Cida and thinks that she moves there to be with Conrado.

Cast

Original Music
 Vida de Empreguete (Life of Empreguete) - Played by Empreguetes
 Marias Brasileiras (Brazilian Marias) - Played by Empreguetes
 Forro das Curicas - Played by Empreguetes
 Nosso Brilho (Our Glow) - Played by Empreguetes
 Voa, Voa Brabuleta (Fly, Fly Brutterfly) - Played by Chayene
 Vida de Patroete (Life Of Patroete) - Played by Chayene
 Se Você Me Der (If You Give Me) - Played by Fabian

Reception

Ratings

References

External links 
 
 Empreguetes website
 

TV Globo telenovelas
2012 Brazilian television series debuts
2012 Brazilian television series endings
2012 telenovelas
Musical telenovelas
Brazilian telenovelas
Children's telenovelas
Brazilian LGBT-related television shows
Teen telenovelas
Portuguese-language telenovelas
Television shows set in Rio de Janeiro (city)
Television series about fictional musicians